Sam Lewis Bowen (born 14 January 2001) is a Welsh professional footballer who plays as a midfielder for EFL League Two side Newport County. He is a Wales under-21 international.

Club career

Cardiff City
Bowen began his career as a youth player with Cardiff City. Having joined the club's academy at the age of six, he went on to captain the under-18 side before being named as an unused substitute for FA Cup ties against Carlisle United and Reading in January 2020. He signed for Cymru Premier side Barry Town United on loan in October 2020, making his debut in a 0–0 draw with Connah's Quay Nomads. He appeared seven times for Barry, scoring twice, before returning to Cardiff in January 2021 following the suspension of the Cymru Premier due to the COVID-19 pandemic.

Bowen made his professional debut for Cardiff during a 2–0 defeat against Brighton & Hove Albion in the EFL Cup on 24 August 2021. He made his league debut three weeks later in a 2–1 win over Nottingham Forest.

Newport County
On 25 May 2022 it was announced that Bowen would join Newport County on a permanent contract for an undisclosed transfer fee when the transfer window opened on 10 June 2022. He made his debut for Newport on 30 July 2022 in the starting line up for the 1-1 League Two draw against Sutton United.

Personal life
Bowen is the son of former Wales international footballer Jason Bowen. He has an older brother, Jaye, who was also an academy player at Cardiff City.

Career statistics

References

External links
 

2001 births
Living people
Welsh footballers
Wales youth international footballers
Wales under-21 international footballers
Association football midfielders
Cardiff City F.C. players
Barry Town United F.C. players
Newport County A.F.C. players
Cymru Premier players
English Football League players